Shaner is a surname. Notable people with the surname include:

Christie Shaner (born 1984), American soccer defender
James Shaner (1936–2012), American politician
Karan Shaner, Canadian judge
Lee Shaner (born 1981), better known by his stage name Intuition, American rapper
Tom Shaner, American songwriter, musician, performer, director, and writer
Wally Shaner (1900–1992), American baseball player